Diego Torres Rodríguez (born 19 September 1978) is a Spanish footballer who plays for Club Deportivo Betis Club de Fútbol as a striker.

Club career
Torres was born in Valladolid, Castile and León. His La Liga input consisted of seven minutes for CF Extremadura in a 1–0 win against RCD Mallorca, on 3 January 1999.

Over five seasons, Torres amassed Segunda División totals of 103 matches and 21 goals, with Levante UD, Gimnàstic de Tarragona and UD Salamanca. After scoring a career-best 20 times to help the second club to promotion from Segunda División B in 2003–04 he netted 12 the following campaign, adding seven in 2005–06 as they returned to the top flight after 56 years as runners-up.

Torres continued to play well into his 40s, representing teams in the third tier but also in Tercera División and amateur football.

References

External links

1978 births
Living people
Spanish footballers
Footballers from Valladolid
Association football forwards
La Liga players
Segunda División players
Segunda División B players
Tercera División players
Divisiones Regionales de Fútbol players
CF Extremadura footballers
Levante UD footballers
Ontinyent CF players
CE Sabadell FC footballers
Ciudad de Murcia footballers
Novelda CF players
Gimnàstic de Tarragona footballers
Rayo Vallecano players
UD Salamanca players
CF Badalona players
Barakaldo CF footballers
CD Badajoz players
UCAM Murcia CF players
Cultural Leonesa footballers